Megalestes riccii is a species of damselfly in the genus Megalestes.

In China, Megalestes riccii is only known from four localities, but the species is widespread and locally common in montane forested  regions of central and northern Taiwan, including several extensive, protected forested areas. The extent of occurrence for this species is large (EOO is larger than 400,000 km2). The species is therefore assessed as Least Concern.

References

Synlestidae